John Rumney Remer (2 July 1883 – 12 March 1948) was a British Conservative Party politician. He was elected as the Member of Parliament (MP) for Macclesfield at the 1918 general election, and was re-elected at six further general elections. He resigned from Parliament on 6 November 1939 by appointment as Steward of the Chiltern Hundreds.

John Remer's papers are held by the John Rylands Library, Deansgate of the University of Manchester.

References

External links 

1883 births
1948 deaths
Conservative Party (UK) MPs for English constituencies
UK MPs 1918–1922
UK MPs 1922–1923
UK MPs 1923–1924
UK MPs 1924–1929
UK MPs 1929–1931
UK MPs 1931–1935
UK MPs 1935–1945